is an anime television series adaptation of the Ōsama Game cell phone novel and the sequel, Ōsama Game: Extreme. It is animated by Seven.

Plot
An entire high school class of 32 people receive a message on their cellphones from a person known only as the "King." The messages contain orders that the students must obey, or they risk the punishment of death. With their lives on the line, the students soon find out that the orders are getting more and more extreme as time goes on. But one student, Nobuaki Kanazawa, is determined to put a stop to the murderous King's Game, once and for all.

Characters

Nobuaki Kanazawa is one of the main characters in the Ousama Game series. He is a student from Tamaoka High School who transfers to Kure Academy following the first game. Nobuaki was once a cheerful student with many friends before the first King's Game. Afterwards Nobuaki was so mentally damaged that he tried to transfer to a new school. While at this new school, Nobuaki has extreme difficulty making friends due to his aggressive nature and fear of losing any potential friends. Thus, when the King's Game begun again, Nobuaki tries to get everyone to work together to survive but everyone refused to believe him. After the deaths of many classmates, the remaining survivors, with the exception of Natsuko, gradually begin to trust him and be grateful of his attempt to try to save everyone. During the final battle with Natsuko, his throat was cut and he died, he is seen in the afterlife reunited with Chiemi and his other friends who have waited for him to join them.

Naoya Hashimoto is Nobuaki's late best friend and one of the main characters of Ousama Game (Manga adaptation) before the events of Ousama Game The Animation. He died in a dice roll order where one student has to roll a die and name a number of students equal to the number rolled, and the roller and the named students would all get punished. He took the sacrifice to roll the die, rolling a 6.

Chiemi Honda is the late girlfriend of Nobuaki and one of the main characters of Ousama Game (Manga adaptation) before the events of Ousama Game The Animation. She was the second to last survivor. Nobuaki and she were given a final order to kill the person they loved the most. Chiemi killed herself by stabbing herself in the chest so Nobuaki could survive.

Natsuko Honda is the main antagonist of Ousama Game The Animation. She was a popular girl in Class 2-1 of Kure Academy who initially had a crush on Nobuaki. She was a very sweet person, usually being the first to introduce herself, and was cheerful and popular because of her outgoing nature. She was a fast runner as demonstrated at the sports relay race and later, at the King's race order. She is shown to be athletic, as she could climb and jump from a wired fence with ease and helped her team win at sports day. She is also emotional and she confides in her friends. It is revealed in Ousama Game: Kigen that she is the twin sister of Chiemi Honda. She has a darker, more twisted side to her as a result of the events of Ou-sama Game: Rinjou, where she was the lone survivor, but tries to hide it in hopes of a normal school life. She reveals her true colors when the new King's Game began and Nobuaki did not cooperate with her. She was the antithesis of Nobuaki, firmly believing there can be only one survivor and that selfishness and betrayal were necessary for survival. During the final battle, she died by getting slashed in the back by Riona. With her last breath, she also killed Nobuaki, cutting his throat.

Toshiyuki Abe was a student in the first King's game. He became crazed at the dice roll order by trying to force others to roll the die, including his best friend Toshiyuki Fujioka. After being called out as a coward by everyone, he threatens everyone by trying to kill Chiemi, which forces Naoya to step up to roll the die. He died for being amongst the ones named by Naoya.

Shingo Adachi was a student in the first King's Game. He was given an order to text 'DIE' to two other classmates. He had a fight with his friends when debating whom to text DIE to, which eventually resulted in him falling down a flight of stairs and dying.

Kenta Akamatsu was a student in Class 2-1 of Kure Academy. He was a muscular student who was a 'big brother' figure to Nobuaki, coming to his rescue when his classmates beat him up. When Mizuki broke her phone, Kenta, who was ordered by the King to give any classmate an order of his choice, gave himself an order to protect Mizuki's life. He accompanied Nobuaki to go to Yonaki village to research about the King's Game, along with Mizuki. It was where he died, when he failed his order to protect Mizuki.
Mizuki Yukimura

Mizuki Yukimura was a student in Class 2-1 of Kure Academy. She was given an order to text 'DIE' to two other classmates, but resisted and broke her phone. She accompanied Nobuaki and Kenta on the trip to Yonaki Village, where she got a new phone and was caught in a dilemma about whom to text DIE to. At the village, she declared her love for Kenta and wanted to text it to herself so they can both die together. Kenta knocked her out and sent the texts to Natsuko and himself in order to protect Mizuki's life. But it was insufficient as she had broken her original cellphone, and texts sent on a new phone did not count, so she ended up dying with Kenta anyway.

Akira Ono was a student in the first King's game. In the anime, he died for breaking an order to avoid doing an unnecessary action, which was crying. This is different than the manga where he died in a paper-drawing game order where all the boys had to take turns choosing to either take 1, 2, or 3 sheets of paper. In the end whoever who had to take the 100th sheet got punished.

Toshiyuki Fujioka was a student in the first King's game. He was Toshiyuki Abe's friend who died alongside him in the dice roll order.

Tsubasa Furusawa was a student amongst the first casualties of the King's game in Class 2-1 of Kure Academy. He died for disobeying the order of not falling asleep. Nobuaki tried to save him by barging into his house, but was too late.

Nami Hirano was a student in the first King's game. She had an order to give herself an order, so she decided to find and touch the King after being convinced by Nobuaki that the King was a student in the class. It turned out unsuccessful and her punishment was to go blind. The next day, she committed suicide by drowning to help Nobuaki obey his order of losing something important to him.

Hirofumi Inoue was a student in the first King's game. He died for breaking the order to avoid doing an unnecessary action, which was crying. He is a self-confessed "crybaby".

Satomi Ishii was amongst the first victims in the original Ousama Game. She died as punishment for not letting Hideki Toyota touch her breasts.

Ria Iwamura was the third-last survivor in the first King's Game. She was emotionally scarred due to her father raping her when she was younger, resulting in her being quiet and friendless. At first, she was selfishly trying to beat the King's Game by researching on her own, but when there were only three survivors, she reveals to Nobuaki that the King's Game originated from a virus that killed people through hypnosis. She tried to stop the game by deleting the virus from her laptop, but it was a trap and she got punished for trying to quit the game. Her punishment was death by incineration. 

Tatsuya Jinba was a student in class 2-1 of Kure Academy. He died an unspecified death on the second day of the King's Game.

Chia Kawano was a student in the first King's game. She vocally despised Toshiyuki Abe and was quick to call out his behavior at the dice roll order. She ended up amongst the victims of the order along with Toshiyuki.

Yuna Kobayashi was a student in Class 2-1 in Kure Academy. She initially appeared to be friends with Natsuko and participated in the relay race with her at the sports festival, but soon began distrusting her after she showed her true colors after the King's Game has begun. Natsuko used that to her advantage by using reverse psychology to convince her to go the wrong path up the mountain. She eventually falls off a cliff, and gets punished for failing to reach the summit in 24 hours.

Aya Kuramoto was a student of Class 2-1 in Kure Academy. Her order was to lose something precious to her. She tried to obey the order by killing her parents but was unsuccessful. In the end she had to kill her dog, which she resisted, resulting in her death.
Daiki Kurosawa

Kaori Maruoka

Kaori Maruoka was a student in the first King's game. She looked up to Yuusuke who helped stand up to her in elementary school. When Yuusuke died, she thought Nobuaki killed him so she tried to kill him. Eventually she died from breaking the rule to avoid doing the unnecessary action of crying after Nobuaki told her that Yuusuke loved her and told Nobuaki to protect her after his death.
Masami Matsumoto

Masami Matsumoto was a student in the first King's game. She slit her wrists on the night of the dice roll order, likely as an attempted suicide. She ended up dying for good when she was named in the dice roll.
Riona Matsumoto

Riona Matsumoto was the final survivor of Ousama Game: The Animation in Class 2-1 of Kure Academy. During the game, she does research about it and shares information with Nobuaki. She initially acts tough and makes Nobuaki use the honorific -san suffix when addressing her, but gradually falls in love with him. During the race order, she falls behind due to lack of stamina, but Nobuaki repeatedly sacrifices himself by running behind her and even running backwards, which makes her furious as she did not want to see Nobuaki die. In the final showdown, she kills Natsuko with a chainsaw, but Natsuko takes Nobuaki down with her after declaring her love for him. Afterwards, she dragged Nobuaki's body to the beach and it is implied she committed suicide by drowning.
Aimi Murazumi

Aimi Murazami was a student and Natsuko's best friend in Class 2-1 of Kure Academy. At the finger-breaking game, she initially refused to break her fingers to save Natsuko but Natsuko forcefully reminded her of the time they became best friends when Natsuko convinced the initially shy and weak Aimi to come out of her shell and participate in sports, so she ended up saving her. She disliked Nobuaki's aloof nature at first but eventually becomes grateful of his attempts to save everyone, especially at the racing order where Nobuaki tried to carry her. So when either Riona or Nobuaki were destined to die for being furthest away from the mountain, she sacrificed herself by running backwards. 
Teruaki Nagata

Teruaki Nagata was a student in Class 2-1 of Kure Academy. He aspired to be a hairstylist and offered to cut Nobuaki his hair on his first day of class, which he eventually did at the finger-breaking game. After being raped by Natsuko due to an earlier King's order and having his phone stolen, he defied Natsuko and tried to kill her by assigning negative points to her at the finger-breaking game, which was unsuccessful thanks to her convincing of Aimi to save her. Later, Natsuko tampered with Teruaki's phone to block the King's message, resulting in Teruaki de facto breaking the rule of attempting to quit the King's Game, resulting in his death.
Masatoshi Ooi

Masatoshi Ooi was a student in Class 2-1 of Kure Academy. At the racing order, he got shoved down a flight of stairs by classmate Takuya, resulting in him being close to last place. He tries to sacrifice himself by jumping into the ocean, but Nobuaki follows him and tries to save him, but was unsuccessful. However, Masatoshi turns out to have lived just long enough to get punished at the first 8-hour mark, saving Nobuaki and Riona.
Takuya Sakamoto

Takuya Sakamoto was a student in Class 2-1 of Kure Academy. At the racing order, he shoved Masatoshi down a flight of stairs and ditched the group who tried to take care of him. As he approached the summit, he got stuck in a trap set up by Natsuko, who breaks his legs so he can no longer walk. Later, Rina catches up to him but refuses to save him because of what he did to Masatoshi. He eventually died as punishment for failing to reach the summit after 24 hours.
Ryou Sagisawa

Ryou Sagisawa was a student and amongst the last survivors of Class 2-1 of Kure Academy. He had a crush on Teruaki and began going insane after his death. Near the end, he resolved to be a man and sacrifice himself like Teruaki did and Nobuaki tried to do, so when the final order to cut the students' bodies was given, he tried to sacrifice himself by offering to cut his own leg with a chainsaw, resulting in his death from blood loss.
Aya Matsuoka

Aya Matsuoka was a student and amongst the last survivors of Class 2-1 of Kure Academy. Facing the final order from the King, after seeing Natsuko maniacally help her friend Ryou sacrifice himself by cutting his leg, tries to stop Natsuko by strangling her. Natsuko immediately kills her by slicing her torso.
Rina Minami

Rina Minami was a student of Class 2-1 of Kure Academy. Under the King's order to race up Mt. Nuegarebi, she encounters her struggling classmates Takuya and Yuuna, but refuses to save Takuya for what he did to Masatoshi and gives up saving Yuuna after struggling to stop her from falling off a cliff. She then encounters Natsuko who provokes her by asking if her classmates' deaths were in vain and asking if she has the willpower to kill all her remaining classmates to win the game. In a guilt-driven panic, she runs back to try to save them but trips over a branch and falls over a cliff.
Emi Mitazaki

Haruka Momoki

Haruka Momoki was a student of Class 2-1 in Kure Academy. Her order was to let Tsubasa touch her chest, but the order was not doable because Tsubasa had already died, so as a result, she died.
Misaki Nakajima

Minako Nakao

Minako Nakao was a student in the first King's Game. She was Chia Kawano's best friend and was a victim in the dice roll order just like Chia.
Toshifumi Sakakibara

Toshifumi Sakakibara was a student in class 2-1 of Kure Academy. He died for breaking an unspecified order in the second day of the King's Game.
Yuuichi Satou

 Yuuichi Satou was a student in Class 2-1 of Kure Academy. He led the class in confronting Nobuaki for first trying to convince them the King's Game is real, and then for suspecting Nobuaki is the King himself after some classmates had died. While beating up Nobuaki, he died for breaking an unspecified order.
Mami Shirokawa

Makoto Takada

Nanami Takumi

Daisuke Tasaki

 Daisuke Tasaki was Nobuaki's late friend in the first King's Game. His family is very rich and he aspires to be a musician. He had sex with classmate Shouta's girlfriend Misaki due to the King's order. As a result, when Shouta was ordered by the King to assign an order to anybody in the class, he ordered Daisuke to die, resulting in his death.
Hideki Toyota

 Hideki Toyota was amongst the first victims of the first King's Game. He died as punishment for not touching Satomi's breasts.
Kana Ueda

Kana Ueda was a participant in the first King's Game. She lost a popularity contest ordered by the King and committed suicide by jumping out of the window, before seeing the punishment.
Yosuke Ueda

Yosuke Ueda was a participant in the first King's Game. He was close friends with and secretly in love with Kaori Maruoka. He helped Nobuaki do research about the King's Game and found out that it was originally played in a distant village. He died shortly after when he broke the order do avoid doing an unnecessary action, which was crying.
Shouta Yahiro

Shouta Yahiro was a participant in the first King's game. He ordered Daisuke to die after Daisuki had sex with his girlfriend Misaki due to the King's order. He later died as punishment for blocking the King's messages.
Hiroko Yamaguchi

Keita Yamashita

Keita Yamashita was a participant in the first King's game. He was Naoya's friend, but at the dice roll order, his name was unintentionally called by Naoya, resulting in his death.

Media

Manga

Anime
On August 1, 2017 an anime television series adaptation by Seven was announced. It aired from October 5 to December 21, 2017. The series is directed by Tokihiro Sasaki and Kenji Konuta is in charge of series composition. Kan Soramoto and Yōsuke Itō are the character designers, and Soramoto is also credited as the chief animation director. The opening theme is "Feed the Fire" by Coldrain and the ending theme is "Lost Paradise" by Pile. It ran for 12 episodes. Crunchyroll streamed the series while Funimation have licensed the series and streamed an English dub. Anime Limited have licensed the series for a UK release.

Notes

References

External links
 

2017 anime television series debuts
Crunchyroll anime
Fiction about death games
Funimation
Futabasha manga
Horror anime and manga
Seinen manga
Seven (animation studio)